Joe's Menage is a live album by Frank Zappa, posthumously released on October 1, 2008. It contains previously unreleased material from 1975. It is the fourth album in the "Joe's Corsage" series, which is devoted to various rarities compiled by Joe Travers for the Zappa Family Trust. This album contains material from a concert in Williamsburg on November 1, 1975 (the middle part). It presents for the first time extensive recordings featuring vocalist and alto saxophonist Norma Jean Bell, who was only in Zappa's touring band for a brief period in late 1975.

Overview
The album first germinated in 1978 when Zappa gave fan Ole Lysgaard several cassette tapes, including one of this 1975 concert. In 2004, Lysgaard sent the tapes to Gail Zappa who decided to release this particular dub made by Zappa. It was not possible to retrieve Zappa's original tapes, but the tape reel from which Zappa had produced the cassette dub was located in the vault. It was restored by Joe Travers and mastered by John Polito.

Track listing
All compositions and arrangements by Frank Zappa

Musicians
 Frank Zappa – guitar and vocals
 Norma Jean Bell – alto saxophone and vocals
 Napoleon Murphy Brock – tenor saxophone and vocals
 Andre Lewis – keyboards and vocals
 Roy Estrada – bass and vocals
 Terry Bozzio – drums and vocals

Album credits
 Original recording and cassette produced by Frank Zappa
 CD Compilation reconstruction and vaultmeisterment: Joe Travers
 Recordist: Davey Moire
 Mastering and audio restoration: John Polito
 Art direction: Gail Zappa
 Title layout: Keith Lawler
 Production manager: Melanie Starks

References 

 

Live albums published posthumously
Frank Zappa live albums
2008 live albums